Riccardo Gabriele Patrese (born 17 April 1954) is an Italian former racing driver, who raced in Formula One from  to .

He became the first Formula One driver to achieve 200 Grand Prix starts when he appeared at the 1990 British Grand Prix, and then became the first to achieve 250 starts at the 1993 German Grand Prix. For 19 years, he held the record for the most Formula One Grand Prix starts, with 256 races from 257 entries. As of the end of the  season he is the ninth-most experienced F1 driver in history. He won six Formula One races, with a record gap of over six years between two of these – the 1983 South African Grand Prix and 1990 San Marino Grand Prix.

Patrese also competed at the World Sportscar Championship for the Lancia factory team, finishing runner-up in 1982 and collecting eight wins.

Early life and career
Born in Padua, Veneto, Patrese started driving karts at age 9. Growing up near the Italian Alps, he was also selected for the Italian national ski team as a teenager, and was in addition a competitive swimmer. In 1974, he won the Karting World Championship at the Estoril circuit, finishing ahead of second-placed teammate and fellow future F1 driver Eddie Cheever. He received an offer to drive in Formula Italia the following year, finishing second in the championship to another future F1 racer, Bruno Giacomelli. In 1976, he moved up to Formula 3, winning both the Italian and European Formula 3 championships. The following year he moved to Formula 2 before making his Formula One debut midway through the year.

Formula One career

Shadow and Arrows

He made his debut at the 1977 Monaco Grand Prix with the Shadow racing team sponsored by Italian businessman Franco Ambrosio, replacing Renzo Zorzi. He took his first point at the Japanese Grand Prix later that year. Later that year team-leader Jackie Oliver and sponsor Ambrosio left Shadow to form the Arrows team. Patrese and Shadow teammate Alan Jones both received offers from the Williams team for 1978: whilst Jones joined Williams, Patrese linked up with Arrows, alongside Rolf Stommelen. Shadow subsequently took Arrows to court, arguing that Arrows had stolen the design of the Shadow DN9 that Arrows and were essentially running a DN9 under a different name. The court agreed, forcing Arrows to design and construct a totally new car, the Arrows A1, which became the first of the Arrows F1 bloodline.

In 1978 Patrese very nearly won Arrows' second race, the South African Grand Prix, until engine failure forced him to retire 15 laps from the end. He subsequently took second at the Swedish Grand Prix behind Niki Lauda's Brabham BT46B "fan car", in its only appearance before being withdrawn. However, his driving style was perceived by some established drivers, such as Ronnie Peterson and James Hunt, as being over-aggressive. Later that year, at the Italian Grand Prix, Patrese's reputation for aggressive driving was blamed for a first lap major incident. In part, one of the causes suggested was a premature start by the Monza race director, leading to cars at the rear of the field catching up to those in the midfield that had been fully stopped when the green signal was given. This being said, Patrese, Peterson, and 8 others were involved in a 10-car pile-up before turn one, causing a stoppage of the race. Peterson, whose injuries from the chain reaction wreck were not in and of themselves life-threatening, died from an embolism the day after the Grand Prix.

By the next race, the United States Grand Prix, five top drivers - Hunt, Lauda, Mario Andretti, Emerson Fittipaldi and Jody Scheckter - declared that unless Patrese was banned from the race that they would withdraw. The race organizers agreed to this: although Patrese later stated that he obtained a ruling from a local judge in Watkins Glen stating that the ban was a violation of his right to work, Arrows decided to withdraw his entry due to pressure from the organizers and the FIA. He returned to competition at the following race, the Canadian Grand Prix, where he finished fourth.

For years after the crash which caused Peterson's death, Hunt (along with other drivers) blamed Patrese for starting the accident, and viewers of Hunt's commentaries of Formula One races from 1980 to 1993 on BBC Television were regularly treated to bitter diatribes against Patrese when the Italian appeared on screen. Hunt believed that it was Patrese's muscling past that caused the McLaren driven by Hunt and the Lotus driven by Peterson to touch, but Patrese argued that he was already well ahead of the pair before the accident took place. Patrese, together with race director Gianni Restilli, stood trial in Italian criminal court on manslaughter charges for Peterson's death. Both were cleared of wrongdoing on 28 October 1981.

Two of Patrese's most notable performances during his Arrows years were at the United States Grand Prix West in Long Beach, where he finished second in 1980 and took pole position in the following year: he led the latter race before being forced to retire by a blocked fuel filter.

Brabham

In 1982 Patrese moved to Brabham and gained his maiden win at that year's Monaco Grand Prix in rather sensational circumstances. Patrese took the lead when Alain Prost crashed out, only to spin in dampening conditions on the next lap. This left him third behind Didier Pironi and Andrea de Cesaris, who both stopped on the final lap – Pironi with an electrical fault and de Cesaris out of fuel. Later that season he also led the Austrian Grand Prix but retired due to an engine failure. Patrese finished the season tenth, just ahead of his teammate Nelson Piquet. 1983 proved to be a more difficult season. Patrese crashed out late in the race while leading at San Marino - to the cheers of the tifosi, as his shunt meant that he handed the race win to Ferrari driver Patrick Tambay. He also took pole on home ground at the Italian Grand Prix, before his engine blew up in the early stages of the race: in a 2010 interview he said he suspected that his engine had been left in its qualifying trim, rendering it extremely powerful but fragile, as he had not been offered a new contract for the following year, and had been reluctant to sacrifice his chances of winning his home Grand Prix for teammate Nelson Piquet, who was fighting for the World Championship. Despite scoring a second win at the South African Grand Prix, Patrese only finished ninth while Piquet claimed his second Drivers' Championship title. It would be seven years before he made another visit to the top step of the podium.

Alfa Romeo

A move to Alfa Romeo in  delivered two lacklustre seasons resulting in eight world championship points and a single visit to the podium at the 1984 Italian Grand Prix. Patrese and teammate, American Eddie Cheever, were hampered by cars with Alfa Romeo 890T V8 turbo engines that proved too thirsty for the amount of fuel they were allowed to carry (220 litres). Often both drivers drove good races to be in the points, only to run out of fuel two or three laps from the finish dropping them out of the points. Indeed, Patrese's 3rd place at Monza in 1984 (to date the final podium finish for Alfa Romeo in F1) came at the expense of Cheever who was robbed of a podium finish when his car ran out of fuel 6 laps from the finish.

The pair were also hampered by their cars. 's Alfa Romeo 184T proved fast in qualifying, but fuel restrictions saw them well off the pace in most races. The 1985 car, the 185T proved to be even less competitive to the point that halfway through the season the team replaced it with an updated version of the 184T (dubbed the 184TB). Although the updated car did prove faster, results were not forthcoming. In an interview in 2000, Patrese described the 185T as "the worst car I ever drove".

At the 1985 Monaco Grand Prix, Patrese's former teammate Nelson Piquet began his 14th lap and was attempting to lap Patrese as they crossed the start/finish line. The cars made contact, and Patrese went into a spin while Piquet lost his suspension. Patrese then bounced off the wall and back into Piquet, and both drivers were out of the race.

Return to Brabham
In 1986 Patrese returned to Brabham alongside fellow Italian Elio de Angelis, but by now the team was a spent force and would never again take a driver to victory in a grand prix. Two more winless seasons followed despite the team's BMW engine being considered at the time to be the most powerful on the grid. Despite the trials of uncompetitive machinery, Patrese never publicly criticised the team and earned respect throughout the sport for his professionalism.

Williams

Toward the end of the 1987 season, Patrese was given the chance to revitalise what seemed to be a declining career when the Williams driver Nigel Mansell was injured whilst qualifying for the Japanese Grand Prix. With the help of Brabham owner and Formula One boss Bernie Ecclestone, Patrese tested the Williams FW11B at Imola, where he set a time that was half a second quicker than Ayrton Senna's pole at that year's San Marino Grand Prix, and was drafted in to replace Mansell for the season's finale in Australia.

Patrese had already been signed by Williams management to be Nelson Piquet's replacement for the  season as the 1987 and triple World Champion was off to Lotus to replace Ayrton Senna who had signed with McLaren (Honda were staying with Lotus for 1988 but Williams had lost their Honda engines to McLaren). However, 1988 saw Williams struggling with an uncompetitive car powered by non-turbocharged Judd V8 engines. Patrese and Mansell were also hampered in the first half of the season by the Williams FW12's reactive suspension not working properly. It wasn't until the British Grand Prix at Silverstone that Williams dumped the reactive suspension for a more conventional one and the FW12s became competitive.

At the 1988 Spanish Grand Prix, Patrese was fined US$10,000 for 'brake testing' the Tyrrell of F1 rookie Julian Bailey during qualifying which caused the Tyrrell 017 to launch its front wheels in the air when Bailey ran into the back of the Williams. One unnamed driver allegedly said of the incident "They should fine him his bloody retainer. There are enough accidental shunts in this business without someone deliberately causing one".

It was not until  and the arrival of the V10 Renault engines that Patrese and his new teammate Thierry Boutsen were able to challenge for race wins. In his record-breaking 176th Grands Prix, Patrese led the first race of the year in Brazil (the first time he led a Grand Prix since 1983) including setting a new lap record of the Autódromo Internacional Nelson Piquet before stopping with an engine failure. In what would prove to be his best season since 1983, he achieved an impressive 3rd place in the Drivers' Championship, taking no wins but securing 6 podium finishes, including 4 second places, as well as claiming pole position in Hungary, a race he confidently led under constant pressure from reigning World Champion Ayrton Senna in his McLaren-Honda V10 until lap 54 when a holed radiator forced his retirement.

In , Patrese finally won his third Grand Prix at the 1990 San Marino Grand Prix, though the competitiveness of the Renault powered FW13B with what many felt were two "number two" drivers waned in the second half of the year as McLaren, Ferrari and later Benetton with their Ford V8 engines took the ascendancy and he finished the  Drivers' Championship in 7th place.

In  Nigel Mansell returned to Williams after two seasons with Ferrari and, together with Patrese, the team became genuine contenders for both the Drivers' and Constructors' Championships. Two wins in Mexico and Portugal gave Patrese his most competitive F1 season thus far and a respectable third place behind Championship contenders Mansell and Senna. In addition he took four pole positions across the season. Patrese also out qualified Mansell at every race until the halfway point of the season at Silverstone for the British Grand Prix, and provided much support for the Englishman's title chase at races such as Italy and Portugal.

Again Patrese handled the delicate situation about team orders diplomatically, repeatedly offering a "No comment" to questions about the team orders that had been imposed on him at the red flag period of the French race. Patrese took a single win at the Japanese Grand Prix and had eight other podium finishes, including six second-place results. After his retirement Patrese stated that Mansell had the edge over him that season because of Mansell's greater upper body strength, as the car's steering was heavy due to the amount of downforce it generated combined with the absence of power steering, whilst Patrese's skill in low speed corners was negated by the car's traction control system.

With Alain Prost, Ayrton Senna and Nigel Mansell all desperately trying to sign for Williams, Patrese's position looked to be under threat and he signed for the Benetton team before the end of the year. His teammate for  would be young German driver Michael Schumacher. Ironically, only Prost was able to agree terms with Williams for 1993 (Mansell went on to race in the American-based Champ Car series while Prost had a clause in his contract, signed in early 1992, that prevented Senna from being his teammate). This would have left a seat free for Patrese had he remained with the team. Although Williams offered Patrese the opportunity to stay with the team after Mansell announced his retirement from F1 at the Italian Grand Prix, he felt he could not go back on his word to Benetton.

Benetton

While Williams continued to dominate F1 in 1993, Patrese found it difficult to get along with team manager Flavio Briatore, sensing that the team's concentration was on his new teammate Michael Schumacher. Patrese would also describe the Benetton B193 with its Ford HBA8 V8 as a step down in quality compared to the much more sophisticated Williams cars he had been driving for the previous five years. After scoring 56 points and finishing 2nd in the World Championship in 1992, Patrese scored 20 points to finish 5th in 1993 with a best finish of 2nd in Hungary in what was to prove to be his final season in Formula One. Before the end of the season Briatore informed Patrese that he was "free to seek an alternate drive". Ligier made Patrese an offer for 1994 but seeing it as a further step down in his career, he decided against it.

Retirement
As most top teams already had drivers signed for 1994, Patrese opted for retirement and brought what was then the longest F1 career in history to a conclusion. Patrese was invited to rejoin Williams in 1994 to fill the seat of Ayrton Senna after his fatal accident at Imola, but ultimately decided against returning to Formula One. A DTM test with Mercedes-Benz in July 1994 did not come to fruition either. In the second half of 1996, as thanks for his years of service to Williams, the team invited Patrese to test their latest car, the FW18, at Silverstone, with the Italian reportedly setting a time that would have placed him on the second row of the grid for that year's British Grand Prix.

After this, Patrese competed in the 24 Hours of Le Mans in 1997. He drove a Nissan R390 GT1 for the Nissan factory team; the car was third fastest in qualifying but was forced to retire with gearbox problems. After retiring from racing, he took up show jumping, following in the footsteps of his daughters who have competed in the sport internationally. He won an Italian national amateur title before retiring from equestrianism in 2014. Outside of competition, he is a keen collector of model railways, in particular those manufactured by Märklin.

In 2005 he returned to racing in the inaugural season of the Grand Prix Masters formula for retired F1 drivers. He finished third behind his former teammate Nigel Mansell and Emerson Fittipaldi in the sole 2005 race at Kyalami, South Africa. His 2006 season was less successful with a 10th-place finish at Losail in Qatar and a 6th at Silverstone.

Patrese's record of 257 Grand Prix entries, set in a period when a typical F1 season was limited to 16 races, stood for 15 years, surviving the Schumacher era when Michael Schumacher retired on 250 race entries. Rubens Barrichello finally surpassed Patrese's total, recording his 258th Grand Prix entry at the 2008 Turkish Grand Prix.  As part of the "handover", Patrese tested a Honda RA107 at Jerez on 9 September (Barrichello was driving for Honda at the time). Schumacher subsequently came out of retirement and became the second driver to surpass Patrese's former record.

In July 2018 it was announced that Patrese would come out of retirement to compete at the Spa 24 Hours that month, competing in the pro-am category in a JAS Motorsport-run Honda NSX GT3 with Loïc Depailler (the son of former F1 driver Patrick Depailler), Bertrand Baguette and Esteban Guerrieri.

Racing record

Career summary

Complete European Formula Two Championship results
(key) (Races in bold indicate pole position; races in italics indicate fastest lap)

Complete Formula One World Championship results
(key) (Races in bold indicate pole position / Races in italics indicate fastest lap)

 Driver did not finish the Grand Prix, but was classified as he completed over 90% of the race distance.

Complete 24 Hours of Le Mans results

Complete Super Tourenwagen Cup results
(key) (Races in bold indicate pole position) (Races in italics indicate fastest lap)

Complete Grand Prix Masters results
(key) Races in bold indicate pole position, races in italics indicate fastest lap.

References

External links

 The Riccardo Patrese Website
 Riccardo Patrese: The Italian Hero

1954 births
Living people
Sportspeople from Padua
Italian racing drivers
Italian Formula One drivers
Alfa Romeo Formula One drivers
Arrows Formula One drivers
Benetton Formula One drivers
Brabham Formula One drivers
Shadow Formula One drivers
Williams Formula One drivers
Formula One race winners
European Formula Two Championship drivers
FIA European Formula 3 Championship drivers
Grand Prix Masters drivers
24 Hours of Le Mans drivers
Karting World Championship drivers
World Sportscar Championship drivers
Nismo drivers
BMW M drivers